The Amazing Spider-Man is an American comic book series about Spider-Man, published by Marvel Comics.

The Amazing Spider-Man may also refer to:

Comics
 The Amazing Spider-Man (comic strip)

Film
 Spider-Man (1977 film) starring Nicholas Hammond, also known as The Amazing Spider-Man on home media
 The Amazing Spider-Man (film), a reboot of the Spider-Man film franchise
 The Amazing Spider-Man (soundtrack), a film-score album from the 2012 film, composed by James Horner
Peter Parker (The Amazing Spider-Man film series), the title character of the film series

Television
 The Amazing Spider-Man (TV series) starring Nicholas Hammond, which evolved out of the 1977 film

Games
 The Amazing Spider-Man (1990 video game)
 The Amazing Spider-Man (2012 video game)
 The Amazing Spider-Man (handheld video game)
 The Amazing Spider-Man (pinball)

See also
 The Amazing Spider-Man 2 (disambiguation)
 Spider-Man (disambiguation)